Dennis Greene may refer to:

 Denny Greene (1949–2015), American singer
 Dennis Greene (footballer) (born 1968), English footballer and manager